The 1987 Matchroom Irish Professional Championship was a professional invitational snooker tournament, which took place between 27 and 30 May 1987 at the Antrim Forum in Antrim, Northern Ireland.

Dennis Taylor won the title beating Joe O'Boye 9–2 in the final.

Main draw

References

Irish Professional Championship
Irish Professional Championship
Irish Professional Championship
Irish Professional Championship